Latvian passports are issued to citizens of Latvia for identity and international travel purposes. Receiving a valid passport is mandatory from the age of 15, but passports can be requested for younger children if needed for travel and other purposes. A passport is valid for 10 years if the citizen is 20 or older, for 5 years if 5–20 and for 2 years if 0–5 years old. Non-citizen passports, and refugee travel documents (in a passport-like format), have been issued until 2020. Every Latvian citizen is also a citizen of the European Union. The passport, along with the national identity card, allows Latvian citizens to travel and to have rights of free movement and rights to reside in any states of the European Union, European Economic Area and Switzerland.

Physical appearance
Latvian passports are burgundy red, with the Coat of arms of Latvia emblazoned in the center of the front cover. The words EIROPAS SAVIENĪBA (Latvian for "European Union") and LATVIJAS REPUBLIKA (Latvian for "Republic of Latvia") are inscribed above the coat of arms, and the word PASE (Latvian for "Passport") below. The Latvian passport has the standard biometric symbol emblazoned below the coat of arms and uses the standard European Union design.

Identity information page

The Latvian passport includes the following data:

 Photo of passport holder
 Type (P)
 Code of issuing state (LVA)
 Passport no.
 1. Surname
 2. Given names
 3. Nationality
 4. Height
 5. Sex
 6. Date of birth
 7. Personal no.
 8. Authority (place of issue)
 9. Place of birth
 10. Date of issue
 11. Holder's signature
 12. Date of expiry

The information page ends with the transparent line and the Machine Readable Zone.

Optionally, the passport may also include information about the passport holder's ethnicity, underage children and their name in different orography (historical form or original form in a different language).

Languages
The data page/information page is printed in Latvian, English and French.

Visa requirements

In 2020, Latvian citizens had visa-free or visa-on-arrival access to 180 countries and territories, ranking the Latvian passport 10th in the world according to the Visa Restrictions Index.

Current passport
Fourth version (current): since 28 January 2015. Burgundy cover. 

Third version: from 20 November 2007 until 27 January 2015. Burgundy cover. First Latvian biometric passport (also called ePassport) to comply with the EU passport standards in all respects: format, security features. Passport also compliant with the US Visa Waiver Program.

Second version: from 1 July 2002 until 19 November 2007. Blue cover with scanned autograph and photo.

First version: from 1992 until 30 June 2002. Blue cover with glued photo. 

Current Latvian passports:

See also
 List of passports
 Passports of the European Union
 Visa requirements for Latvian citizens
 Visa requirements for Latvian non-citizens

References

External links
Information on Latvian citizen's passport 
Photo gallery of Latvian electronic passport (Apollo.lv)
Citizen passport 

Latvia
Government of Latvia
Latvian nationality law
European Union passports